Milliy Bog is a station of the Tashkent Metro on Chilonzor Line. The station was opened on 6 November 1977 as part of the inaugural section of Tashkent Metro, between October inkilobi and Sabir Rakhimov. Until 1 May 1992 the station was known as Komsomolskaya, and then until 10 October 2005 as Yoshlik.

References

Tashkent Metro stations
Railway stations opened in 1977